The 1969 UK & Ireland Greyhound Racing Year was the 43rd year of greyhound racing in the United Kingdom and Ireland.

Roll of honour

Summary
The Greyhound Racing Association (GRA) granted an option to Stock Conversion and Investment Ltd, for the purchase of greyhound racing's premier track White City Stadium for redevelopment. The official line was that a new modern White City stadium would be built in the remaining four acres from the existing 16 acres. However reporter Neil Martin stated "this move must spell death to all sport there in time – and in my opinion greyhound racing too". Fellow reporter John Bower had a different view, in that it would create a wonderful new stadium, a view seemingly given substance by the GRA, who announced that the architects plans were already drawn up. The GRA then announced that New Cross Stadium had been sold for development and it was closed in April. The GRA Property Trust was culling tracks at an alarming rate within the industry.  They did however buy a large part of Wimbledon Stadium after a prolonged battle with developers attempting a takeover bid.

Tracks
The list of greyhound tracks closing continued to grow. Park Royal Stadium, owned by London Stadiums Ltd, literally closed overnight on 22 January. Greenfield Stadium, Bradford closed, becoming the third site in three months to shut down; the final meeting was held on 5 March after being bought by Morrison's for redevelopment as industrial units. Aberdeen closed and was converted to a supermarket and warehouses. Former NGRC track Rochdale also closed.  Corbiewood Stadium opened to greyhound racing.

Hackney Wick Stadium and Hendon Greyhound Stadium both received Bookmakers Afternoon Greyhound Service (BAGS) contracts replacing New Cross and Park Royal. New Cross trainers Charlie Smoothy and John Shevlin joined Clapton Stadium and West Ham Stadium respectively.

Competitions
The 1,000 Guineas switched to Hendon Greyhound Stadium from the closed Park Royal Stadium. Tony's Friend lifted the Grand National at White City, in addition to the Scottish Grand National and set up a sequence of fourteen consecutive wins before being beaten. Tony's Friend continued his winning ways, lifting the Grand National of the West at Gloucester & Cheltenham Stadium but he was a little lucky because the leader fell at the first hurdle; that leader was a new hurdler called Sherrys Prince. 

Yellow Printer continued to set special times and recorded 28.38 seconds when winning the Sir Billy Butlin Stakes at White City.

With little warning the Scottish Derby at Carntyne Stadium in Glasgow which was due to run on 30 August was cancelled, it would never be run at the track again.

News
Pigalle Wonder died during the first days of January aged nearly thirteen. The National Greyhound Racing Club changed the rule whereby parties could be represented by legal counsel at steward's inquiries. 
The Greyhound Express was published for the last time on 8 November. The Sporting Life would take over the sponsorship of the Juvenile from the Express.

Wembley trainer Ronnie Melville retired, which led to Tom Johnston Jr. switching from West Ham and Jim Singleton taking Johnston's vacated post at West Ham. The sports current top trainer John Bassett left Clapton to take break from greyhound racing. H.R.H the Prince Edward, Duke of Kent became a greyhound owner after acquiring Peaceful Glen who was put with Joe Pickering at White City. 

Portsmouth trainer Charlie Curtis, brother of George Curtis was killed in a car crash.  The WGRF (World Greyhound Racing Federation) was formed.

Ireland
The Irish Greyhound Board purchased Cork Greyhound Stadium for £127,500. Sand Star won the English Greyhound Derby but lost out to Own Pride for the Irish Greyhound of the Year, the latter had won the Irish Greyhound Derby. It was also the last Derby to be held at Harold's Cross Stadium.

Principal UK races

	

+Track record

Principal Irish races

u=unplaced

Totalisator returns

The totalisator returns declared to the licensing authorities for the year 1969 are listed below.

References 

Greyhound racing in the United Kingdom
Greyhound racing in the Republic of Ireland
UK and Ireland Greyhound Racing Year
UK and Ireland Greyhound Racing Year
UK and Ireland Greyhound Racing Year
UK and Ireland Greyhound Racing Year